Ichum Lairembi or Echum Lairembi or Eechum Lairembi is a Lairembi (goddess) in Meitei mythology and religion of Ancient Kangleipak. Her major cult centre of worship is located in Khurkhul region, present day Manipur.

Legends 
According to legends, the power of Goddess Ichum Lairembi resides at Thingba Maran Ngambi. It is the reason why all the offerings brought for Goddess Ichum Lairembi  are offered to Thingba Maran Ngambi.

In a legend, Princess Thoibi of Ancient Moirang was once ordered by the King of Moirang to throw an egg. So, she and her slaves proceeded to a journey to carry on the task. The egg they brought fell on ground and got broken at the area of Goddess Ichum Lairembi in Khurkhul. From that time onwards, they started to live in the place and celebrate Lai Haraoba festival to please Goddess Ichum Lairembi.

Festival 
Every year, the sacred Lai Haraoba festival is celebrated in honor Goddess Ichum Lairembi. Among the places of celebrations of the holy festival, Khurkhul is the predominant one.

See also 
 Irai Leima
 Irai Ningthou

References

External links 

 The Geography Of Manipur_INTERNET ARCHIVE
 
 Registrar, India Office of the (1976). Census of India, 1971: A-10:B. District census handbook. Town & village directory. Primary census abstract [name of district. Controller of Publications.
 Manipur, India Director of Census Operations (1973). District Census Handbook: Manipur Central District. Census Operations, Manipur.

Meitei deities
Leima